The 1852 United States presidential election in Alabama took place on November 2, 1852, as part of the 1852 United States presidential election. Voters chose nine representatives, or electors to the Electoral College, who voted for president and vice president.

Alabama voted for the Democratic candidate, Franklin Pierce, over Whig candidate Winfield Scott. Pierce won Alabama by a margin of 26.77%.

Results

See also
United States presidential elections in Alabama

References

Alabama
1852
1852 Alabama elections